This is a list of albums released by the now-defunct record label DreamWorks Records, which include studio albums and soundtrack albums.

DreamWorks Records

DreamWorks Nashville

References 

 
Discographies of American record labels